Foxhole (Scottish Gaelic: A 'Bhog solla) is a small hamlet in the Highland council area of Scotland. It is 2 miles (3.2 km) south of the village of Kiltarlity and 9.5 miles (15.4 km) southwest of Inverness, on the hillside opposite Ardendrain.

The hamlet's name is one of few in the area not derived from Gaelic. Instead, Foxhole is a simple compound of English fox and hole—a reference to the red fox native to the Aird's woodlands. It does not come up in writing until 1828, when it was recorded as "Foxhall" in plans of Belladrum Estate. This was at a time when Gaelic usage was dimininishing in the Scottish Highlands.

Today, Foxhole remains largely a farming community with several holiday cottages; the old school has been converted into a home. Foxhole is served by Tomnacross Primary School, with high school students attending Charleston Academy in Inverness.

References 

Villages in Highland (council area)